Disenchanted is a 2022 American live-action/animated musical fantasy comedy film directed by Adam Shankman and written by Brigitte Hales, based on a story by Richard LaGravenese and the writing team of J. David Stem and David N. Weiss. Co-produced by Walt Disney Pictures, Josephson Entertainment, and Right Coast Productions, it is the sequel to the 2007 film Enchanted. 

Amy Adams, Patrick Dempsey, James Marsden, and Idina Menzel reprise their roles from the first film, with Gabriella Baldacchino replacing Rachel Covey (who makes a cameo as a different character). They are joined by newcomers Maya Rudolph, Yvette Nicole Brown, Jayma Mays, Kolton Stewart, Oscar Nunez, and Griffin Newman. Alan Menken and Stephen Schwartz returned as the film's songwriters, while Menken also composed the score, and Adams served as a producer of the film alongside Barry Josephson and Barry Sonnenfeld.

Talks of an Enchanted sequel began in early 2010, but the project languished in development hell for several years. By 2017, it was announced Adams had signed on to reprise her role and filming was set to begin that summer, but it never came to fruition. The film was officially announced in December 2020, with the cast joining in spring 2021 and filming taking place in Ireland between May and July that year.

Disenchanted premiered at the El Capitan Theatre in Los Angeles on November 16, 2022, and was released in the United States via Disney+ on November 18. Unlike its predecessor, the film received mixed reviews from critics, who mostly praised Adams' performance.

Plot
Ten years after the events of the first film, Giselle, Robert, and Morgan Philip are living happily together with their baby Sofia. However, life in Manhattan is starting to drag on them, so Giselle plans to move the family to Monroeville, a suburban town. The moving brings poor first experiences for them: their new house needs to be renovated, Robert has to commute to continue his job, and Morgan feels like an outcast at her new school. 

King Edward and Queen Nancy visit from Andalasia to present them with a wish-granting wand. Giselle meets Malvina Monroe, the arrogant head of the town council, and learns that she is hosting a fairytale-themed ball, where Malvina's son Tyson is the ball's elected prince. To help Morgan to fit in, Giselle tries to get her elected as the ball's princess but ends up unwittingly embarrassing Morgan, resulting in a falling out between the two. 

After consulting with her chipmunk friend Pip, Giselle decides to use the wand and wishes her family's life to be a "perfect fairy tale". By the next day, the town has transformed into a fantasy kingdom called Monrolasia. Morgan is happy with their new life, and Robert believes himself to be a brave adventurer. Malvina is now the town's evil queen with magical powers. Giselle also discovers uncharacteristically haughty behavior and finds pleasure in mistreating Morgan. Realizing that she is slowly turning into a wicked stepmother, Giselle asks for help from the magic wand's instruction scroll. The scroll reveals that Giselle's wish is using up Andalasia's magic to change the real world into a fairy tale and that it will become permanent after midnight. 

Malvina learns about the magic wand and enlists her two servants, Rosaleen and Ruby, to steal it; however, the scroll tells her that the wand can only be used by a "true Andalasian". Giselle realizes that without the wand, she will lose herself to her wicked side, so she convinces Morgan to save them before sending her to Andalasia. There, Morgan learns that the kingdom's magic is transported to Monrolasia through a vortex, and once the spell becomes permanent, Andalasia will be gone forever. Nancy and Edward suggest that Morgan use the magic of the memories to remind Giselle of her true self. Morgan recreates a childhood drawing of their family tree with pictures of their shared memories, then heads back to the real world with Nancy. 

Giselle, now under the influence of her evil personality, challenges Malvina for the royal title of Monrolasia. Giselle sends Pip, who has been turned into a tabby cat, to steal back the wand while also sending Robert on an assumed futile search for Morgan. At the ball, Giselle and Malvina engage in a magic duel, with the former easily overpowering the latter. Morgan and Nancy meet up with Robert and Tyson before rushing into the town hall to stop the duel. Morgan tosses her drawing to Giselle, who rips it, but the magic within brings the memories to life, restoring Giselle to normal. 

Not wanting the spell to be broken, Malvina takes Morgan hostage and demands the wand in exchange. Giselle surrenders the wand, and Malvina breaks it in two. As midnight approaches, everything from Andalasia begins to disappear, including Giselle herself. While Robert and Tyson head to the top of the clock tower to delay the final chime, Giselle tells Morgan that by being her daughter, she is a true Andalasian, therefore capable of using the wand. Morgan wishes she were home with her mother just as Malvina attempts to make the clock tower chime before it was destroyed.

Morgan awakens in their house and finds everything normal again. Only she and Giselle are aware of the events, while everyone else believes it to be a dream. Giselle apologizes to Malvina for stepping over her plans, with Malvina allowing Giselle to join her town council. Sometime later, Robert has moved his practice to Monroeville, Morgan and Tyson have started dating, and Nancy and Edward arrive for another visit to the Philips in their now happy life.

Cast

 Amy Adams as Giselle, Robert's wife, Morgan's stepmother, and Sofia's mother. Her Monrolasia counterpart has her slowly becoming like the wicked stepmother from Cinderella.
 Patrick Dempsey as Robert Philip, a lawyer who is Giselle's husband and Morgan and Sofia's father. His Monrolasia counterpart works as a knight.
 Maya Rudolph as Malvina Monroe, a realtor and the snooty head of Monroeville's town council. Her Monrolasia counterpart is similar to the Evil Queen.
 Yvette Nicole Brown as Rosaleen, a sensible woman who is one of Malvina's assistants. Her Monrolasia counterpart works for Queen Malvina.
 Jayma Mays as Ruby, a dimwitted woman who is one of Malvina's assistants. Her Monrolasia counterpart works for Queen Malvina.
 Gabriella Baldacchino as Morgan Philip, Robert's 16-year-old daughter, Sofia's older half-sister, and Giselle's stepdaughter. Baldacchino replaced Rachel Covey, who originally played Morgan in the first film.
 Idina Menzel as Nancy Tremaine, Edward's wife and Queen of Andalasia
 James Marsden as Edward, Nancy's husband and King of Andalasia

The original Morgan, Rachel Covey, has a cameo as a Monrolasia native who reminds Giselle that the festival is that night.

Additionally, Oscar Nunez appears as Edgar, a barista and Malvina's informant whose Monrolasia counterpart is a Magic Mirror that Queen Malvina owns. Kolton Stewart portrays Tyson Monroe, Malvina's son and Morgan's love interest, and later boyfriend whose Monrolasia counterpart is a prince. Griffin Newman provides the voice of Pip, a chipmunk friend of Giselle and the narrator of the film. Unlike the first film, Pip is able to speak in both the real world and Andalasia through magic. Newman replaces Jeff Bennett and Kevin Lima from the first film. 

Alan Tudyk provides the voice of the talking scroll. James Monroe Iglehart, Michael McCorry Rose, and Ann Harada portray a weary businessman, a disgruntled businessman, and a sardonic businesswoman, Robert's fellow train commuters whose Monrolasia counterparts are a baker, a sign painter, and a florist respectively. Twins Mila and Lara Jackson play Robert and Giselle's 1-year-old daughter Sofia.

Jodi Benson, who played Sam, the secretary at Robert's law firm in the first film, filmed a scene for this film, but it was ultimately cut.

Production

Development
In February 2010, Variety reported that Walt Disney Pictures planned to film a sequel to Enchanted (2007) with Barry Josephson and Barry Sonnenfeld producing again. Jessie Nelson was attached to write the screenplay and Anne Fletcher to direct. Disney hoped the cast members from the first film would return and for a release as early as 2011.

On January 12, 2011, composer Alan Menken was asked about the sequel in an interview, to which he replied:"I've heard things but there's nothing yet. I don't know much about what's happening with that. Honestly, I don't know what the studio wants to do next. I presume there will be some future projects for me to work on. I love doing that, I really do. But I'm not frustrated that it isn't one of them. At the moment I have a lot of stage things happening and I'm busy enough with that, so I really don't need more on my plate."Later that year, on March 28, 2011, James Marsden, who played Prince Edward in Enchanted, was asked about the sequel.

By July 2014, Disney had hired screenwriters J. David Stem and David N. Weiss to write a script for a sequel and also hired Fletcher to direct the film. In October 2016, The Hollywood Reporter announced that Adam Shankman, who is a good friend of Fletcher, entered negotiations to direct the sequel, titled Disenchanted; that Amy Adams would reprise her role; and that filming was scheduled to begin in summer 2017. In January 2018, Shankman stated that the sequel's script would be finished within a couple of weeks and the next step would be to get the music written. He also went on to say that the film would feature more songs than the original but the same amount of animation.

On May 21, 2019, Menken said that the film had not been green-lighted by Disney by that point, as the writers were still "trying to get the script right." On February 28, 2020, Schwartz said that meetings about the film had taken place in London, and revealed that Shankman will also serve as the writer for the film.

In December 2020, at Disney Investor Day, Disney Studios' President of Production Sean Bailey officially announced the sequel. Reportedly, it was the work of Brigitte Hales—the most recent writer on the project—that got the sequel greenlit after 13 years.

In January 2021, Patrick Dempsey told Good Morning America that there are plans to begin production in the spring of that year.

Casting
At the Disney Investor Day event, it was announced that Amy Adams would be returning as Giselle. Dempsey confirmed the news in early January 2021 during an interview on Good Morning America. (In an interview with Variety magazine in late April, Dempsey also revealed that he would be singing.) In March 2021, composer Alan Menken confirmed that James Marsden and Idina Menzel would also be returning as Prince Edward and Nancy Tremaine, respectively.

In April 2021, Maya Rudolph, Yvette Nicole Brown, and Jayma Mays joined the cast as new characters. Rudolph plays the central antagonist in the sequel, while Brown and Mays are portraying villains, as well.

On May 17, 2021, Disney announced via Twitter that Gabriella Baldacchino would be starring as Morgan Philip, joined by new cast members Kolton Stewart and Oscar Nunez. Baldacchino replaced Rachel Covey, who played Morgan in the first film.

Filming
Principal photography was previously expected to start on May 3, 2021, in Los Angeles. The film would be partly filmed in Enniskerry, where a set was being constructed as of May 1, 2021, while other expected locations include Wicklow and Dublin. On May 6, 2021, Adams confirmed on Instagram that she had arrived in Ireland to begin filming the film. Filming officially began on May 17, 2021. On July 8, 2021, James Marsden and Idina Menzel arrived in Dublin to shoot their roles as Prince Edward and Nancy Tremaine, respectively. Filming in Ireland concluded on July 22, 2021.

By March 28, 2022, reshoots were underway in Hambleden, Buckinghamshire, England due to mixed reception at a test screening. Reshoots also took place in New York City, having concluded in April.

Animation
On December 3, 2021, it was announced that Canadian animation studio Tonic DNA was working on the animation for the sequel. Moving Picture Company provides visual effects for the film.

Music

In March 2018, director Adam Shankman revealed that Alan Menken and Stephen Schwartz will return from the first film to write songs for the sequel. In April 2020, Menken said that he and Schwartz are writing the film's songs.

In an interview with Variety magazine in late April 2021, Patrick Dempsey revealed that he will be singing. In May 2021, Schwartz said that the film will have seven songs and reprises, including two songs for Nancy, played by Menzel, whose song in the first film was cut.

The score and song underscoring of the film was recorded at the Newman Scoring Stage on August 29, 2022.

An interview with Entertainment Weekly revealed that one of the songs, sung by Giselle, would be called "Fairy Tale Life", and that one of Nancy's songs will be called "Love Power". On November 16, 2022, Menzel announced that the latter song would be released as a single the following day.

During "Disney+ Night" on Dancing with the Stars, host Tyra Banks announced the soundtrack would be released on November 18, 2022.

Marketing

On November 12, 2021, which was Disney+ Day, the film's logo was revealed. On May 17, 2022, a first look was revealed, depicting both Giselle and Malvina. On September 9, 2022, at the D23 Expo, a teaser trailer was unveiled. The official trailer was released on November 1, 2022.

A featurette titled "Nostalgia" was released, showcasing some of the film's animated sequences. It was taken down from YouTube but reuploaded on November 12, 2022.

Release
Disenchanted was originally scheduled to premiere exclusively on Disney+ on November 24, 2022, which would have coincided with Thanksgiving. On October 18, 2022, it was announced that the release would be moved up six days and would now be released on November 18, although keeping the original release date on November 24 in some territories. It premiered at the El Capitan Theatre in Los Angeles on November 16, 2022, and was released on Disney+ on November 18.

Reception

Audience viewership 
According to the streaming aggregator JustWatch, Disenchanted was the 4th most streamed film across all platforms in the United States, during the week of November 14, 2022 to November 20, 2022,  the 2nd during the week of November 21, 2022 to November 27, 2022, and the 3rd during the month of November 2022. According to Whip Media, Disenchanted was the 3rd most streamed film across all platforms in the United States, during the week of November 18, 2022 to November 20, 2022, and the 2nd during the week of November 25, 2022 to November 27, 2022.

Critical response
 On Metacritic, the film has a weighted average score of 50 out of 100, based on 29 critics, indicating "mixed or average reviews."

Accolades 
The film is one of the media that received the ReFrame Stamp for the years 2022 to 2023. The stamp is awarded by the gender equity coalition ReFrame and industry database IMDbPro for film and television projects that are proven to have gender-balanced hiring, with stamps being awarded to projects that hire female-identifying people, especially women of color, in four out of eight key roles for their production.

References

External links
 
 
 

2022 films
2022 fantasy films
2022 romantic comedy films
2020s American films
2020s English-language films
2020s fantasy comedy films
2020s musical comedy films
2020s parody films
2020s romantic musical films
2020s romantic fantasy films
2020s satirical films
American animated fantasy films
American fantasy comedy films
American films with live action and animation
American musical comedy films
American musical fantasy films
American parody films
American romantic comedy films
American romantic musical films
American romantic fantasy films
American satirical films
American sequel films
Disney parodies
Disney+ original films
 
Fairy tale parody films
Films about princesses
Films about wish fulfillment
Films about witchcraft
Films directed by Adam Shankman
Films impacted by the COVID-19 pandemic
Films produced by Barry Sonnenfeld
Films scored by Alan Menken
Films set in New York City
Films shot in Buckinghamshire
Films shot in County Wicklow
Films shot in Dublin (city)
Films shot in Los Angeles
Films shot in New York City
Magic realism films
Sword and sorcery films
Walt Disney Pictures films
Films about teenagers
Films about magic